The 2013 Citi Open (known as such for sponsorship reasons) was a tennis tournament played on outdoor hard courts. It was the 45th edition (for the men) and the 3rd edition (for the women) of the event known that year as the Citi Open (previously known on the men's tour as the Legg Mason Tennis Classic), and was part of the ATP World Tour 500 series of the 2013 ATP World Tour, and of the WTA International tournaments of the 2013 WTA Tour. It took place at the William H.G. FitzGerald Tennis Center in Washington, D.C., United States, from July 27 to August 4, 2013. Juan Martín del Potro and Magdaléna Rybáriková won the singles titles.

ATP singles main-draw entrants

Seeds

1 Rankings are as of July 22, 2013

Other entrants
The following players received wild cards into the main singles draw:
  Juan Martín del Potro 
  James Duckworth
  Steve Johnson
  Denis Kudla 
  Jack Sock

The following players received entry from the singles qualifying draw:
  Somdev Devvarman
  Matthew Ebden 
  Samuel Groth 
  Alex Kuznetsov
  Tim Smyczek
  Yūichi Sugita

The following players received entry as lucky losers:
  Jesse Levine
  Rhyne Williams

Withdrawals
Before the tournament
  Feliciano López (fatigue)
  Gaël Monfils
  Jo-Wilfried Tsonga

ATP doubles main-draw entrants

Seeds

1 Rankings are as of July 22, 2013

Other entrants
The following pairs received wildcards into the doubles main draw:
  James Blake /  Eric Butorac 
  Steve Johnson /  Sam Querrey

Withdrawals
Before the tournament
  Bob Bryan (shoulder injury)

WTA singles main-draw entrants

Seeds

1 Rankings are as of July 22, 2013

Other entrants
The following players received wild cards into the main singles draw:
  Beatrice Capra 
  Angelique Kerber
  Taylor Townsend

The following players received entry from the singles qualifying draw:
  Irina Falconi
  Michelle Larcher de Brito
  Alexandra Mueller
  Jessica Pegula

Withdrawals
Before the tournament
  Lauren Davis
  Camila Giorgi
  Simona Halep (back injury)
  Kaia Kanepi
  Johanna Larsson
  Anabel Medina Garrigues
  Romina Oprandi
  Nadia Petrova

Retirements
  Monica Niculescu (left wrist injury)
  Olga Puchkova (defaulted)
  Lesia Tsurenko (right thigh injury)

WTA doubles main-draw entrants

Seeds

1 Rankings are as of July 22, 2013

Finals

Men's singles

 Juan Martín del Potro defeated  John Isner, 3–6, 6–1, 6–2

Women's singles

 Magdaléna Rybáriková defeated  Andrea Petkovic, 6–4, 7–6(7–2)

Men's doubles

 Julien Benneteau /  Nenad Zimonjić defeated  Mardy Fish /  Radek Štěpánek, 7–6(7–5), 7–5

Women's doubles

 Shuko Aoyama /  Vera Dushevina defeated  Eugenie Bouchard /  Taylor Townsend, 6–3, 6–3

References

External links
Official website

Citi Open
Citi Open
Washington Open (tennis)
2013 in sports in Washington, D.C.